Bob Roberts is a 1992 American satirical mockumentary film written, directed by, and starring Tim Robbins. It depicts the rise of Robert "Bob" Roberts Jr., a right-wing politician who is a candidate for an upcoming United States Senate election. Roberts is well financed, due mainly to past business dealings, and is well known for his folk music, which presents conservative ideas with gusto.

The film is Robbins' directorial debut and is based on a short segment of the same title and featuring the same character that Robbins portrayed on Saturday Night Live. It also marks the film debut of Jack Black.

Plot
Bob Roberts takes place in Pennsylvania in 1990. It depicts a fictitious senatorial race between a conservative Republican folk singer, Bob Roberts, and the incumbent Democrat, Brickley Paiste. The film is shot through the perspective of Terry Manchester, a British documentary filmmaker who is following the Roberts campaign. Through Manchester's lens we see Roberts travel across the state and sing about drug users, lazy people and the triumph of traditional family values and laissez-faire capitalism over the rebelliousness and social justice causes of the 1960s. Even though the Roberts campaign team officially avoids manifestations of open bigotry, their songs, speech and mannerisms are rife with snobbish dog whistles and racist and sexist innuendos, and Manchester's footage reveals casual use of homophobic slurs.

Complementing Manchester's neutral perspective are reflections by Senator Paiste, TV anchor Kelly Noble and investigative reporter Bugs Raplin, among others. Paiste is convinced that Roberts is a master manipulator linked to the National Security Council, the CIA and the military–industrial complex. Throughout the campaign, Raplin attempts to use the documentary being made about Roberts to expose him to the public as a fraud. Raplin believes that Roberts' anti-drug charity, Broken Dove, is connected to an old CIA drug trafficking scheme, citing Roberts' campaign chairman Lukas Hart III's past in the Phoenix Program as proof. Shortly after an acerbic and disastrous interview with Roberts, Kelly Noble points out that his potential for success comes from subverting stereotypes by using his music, a tool of protest typical of the left during the counterculture years, as a vector for postmodern far-right politics. 

As the campaign continues, Paiste remains in the lead until a scandal arises involving him and a young woman who was seen emerging from a car with him. Paiste claims that she was a friend of his granddaughter whom he was driving home, but he cannot shake the accusations. Roberts' campaign suffers a setback as well, when Raplin's accusations briefly gain traction and result in a subpoena on Lukas Hart III for unpaid housing loans rumored to be redirected to drug trafficking.

As the election approaches, Roberts is asked to appear on a network's sketch comedy show. When Roberts announces that he will not be playing the song he had originally proposed, a dispute breaks out between the cast and producers of the show. This new song turns out to be nothing more than a thinly veiled campaign endorsement, and an angry staff member of the network pulls the plug mid-performance. As Roberts is leaving the studio, he is seemingly shot by a would-be assassin. Raplin, who has been causing problems for the campaign, is initially linked to the shooting, but he is later cleared when it is found that due to constrictive palsy in his right hand he physically could not have fired the gun. Following the incident, Raplin contends that Roberts was never actually shot and that the gun was fired into the ground. Raplin's allegations are not confirmed on camera by Roberts campaign member Delores Perrigrew when she is questioned by Manchester, but she does show clear signs of remorse and abruptly quits the campaign.

The campaign is boosted by public support following the assassination attempt, and Roberts wins the election with 52 percent of the vote. Although Roberts claims that his wounds have left him paralyzed from the waist down, he is seen tapping his feet at a celebration party. While Terry Manchester is interviewing Roberts' supporters outside the new senator's hotel, a boy runs up shouting, "He's dead, he's dead, they got him!" When Manchester asks him what he is talking about, the boy shouts, "Bugs Raplin! He's dead! They got him!" A joyful celebration breaks out among Roberts' supporters, the shot changes to an image of his hotel room, and an upright walking shadow suggesting Roberts' profile passes the window before the lights go out. The film ends with a radio news report about Raplin's death at the hands of a right-wing fanatic and a shot of Manchester standing in the Jefferson Memorial, looking at the words, "I have sworn upon the altar of God eternal hostility against every form of tyranny over the mind of man", inscribed there.

Cast

Style
The film's style is drawn from a number of real and mock documentaries, and its shots are crafted to create this effect, in many cases through the use of hand-held cameras. Not only does Roberts' character draw from 1960s-era iconography of Bob Dylan, it also contains scenes inspired by the 1967 documentary, Dont Look Back, made about the singer, employing a similar cinema verité style. Bob Roberts also draws from Rob Reiner's 1984 mockumentary This Is Spinal Tap which Robbins states is one of his favorite films, and directly references this during the scene in which Roberts gets lost in an auditorium attempting to find the stage before his performance. In the case of Gore Vidal's character, the majority of the lines were not scripted, and instead Vidal based his role upon his own political beliefs, and his real-life positions on many of the fictional election topics.

Reception
On Rotten Tomatoes the film has a score of 95% based on 43 reviews, with an average rating of 7.48/10. Its consensus reads "Behind and in front of the camera, Tim Robbins delivers a landslide comedic victory with Bob Roberts – a shrewdly crackling lampoon of modern politics." On Metacritic the film has a weighted average score of 70% based on reviews from 26 critics, indicating "generally favorable reviews". Audiences surveyed by CinemaScore gave the film a grade B+ on scale of A to F.

Roger Ebert gave the film three out of four stars, stating, "I like 'Bob Roberts' – I like its audacity, its freedom to say the obvious things about how our political process has been debased." However, Ebert also stated that the thread about the investigative journalism doesn't work, commenting "if [the film] had been only about campaign tactics and techniques, I would have liked it more."

While critics and audiences responded to this film by connecting Roberts’ character to various political figures, such as George H. W. Bush and Pennsylvania senator Rick Santorum, Robbins has said that the film related more to the political system in general than any specific politician. Much of Robbins' commentary addresses the role of the media in election campaigns. Some have critiqued Robbins for his approach toward political satire, stating that his references to Reagan Era politics and the rebelliousness of the 1960s are simply too anachronistic in the context of the 1990s, but others have praised it for framing political commentary as a Hollywood comedy. In 2018, Robbins said Bob Roberts' came true", referring to President Donald Trump.

References

External links
 
 

Saturday Night Live films
Saturday Night Live in the 1990s
1992 films
American mockumentary films
1990s English-language films
1992 comedy films
American political comedy films
American political satire films
American political films
British political comedy films
British political satire films
British political films
Conservative media in the United States
Films about elections
Films about guitars and guitarists
Films directed by Tim Robbins
Films set in Pittsburgh
Films set in 1990
Political mockumentaries
Self-reflexive films
Miramax films
Paramount Pictures films
PolyGram Filmed Entertainment films
Working Title Films films
Artisan Entertainment films
Georges Delerue Award winners
Films shot in Pittsburgh
1992 directorial debut films
1990s American films
1990s British films